The Women's 55 kg weightlifting competitions at the 2020 Summer Olympics in Tokyo took place on 26 July at the Tokyo International Forum.

The event was won by Hidilyn Diaz, the first Olympic gold medal (in any events) for the Philippines. China's Liao Qiuyun took silver and Zulfiya Chinshanlo of Kazakhstan takes the bronze. 

Meanwhile in the group B, Poland's Joanna Łochowska, Japan's Kanae Yagi, Canada's Rachel Leblanc-Bazinet, Chinese Taipei's Chiang Nien-hsin and Solomon Islands' Mary Kini Lifu earned their top 14 spots.

Records

Results

References

Weightlifting at the 2020 Summer Olympics
Olymp
Women's events at the 2020 Summer Olympics